The Notre-Dame-de-Lourdes College is a high school level education facility located in Longueuil, Quebec, Canada. It is a school which is part of the International Baccalaureate. The students attending the college normally refer to it as NDL, Collège Notre-Dame-de-Lourdes being a long name.

References 

Private schools in Quebec
Notre-Dame-de-Lourdes